The 2005–06 Slovenian PrvaLiga season started on 24 July 2005 and ended on 3 June 2006. Each team played a total of 36 matches.

League table

Relegation play-offs

Bela Krajina won on away goals rule.

Results
Every team plays four times against their opponents, twice at home and twice on the road, for a total of 36 matches.

First half of the season

Second half of the season

Top goalscorers 

Source: PrvaLiga.si

See also
2005–06 Slovenian Football Cup
2005–06 Slovenian Second League

References
General

Specific

External links
Official website of the PrvaLiga 

Slovenian PrvaLiga seasons
Slovenia
1